Here is a list of the award winners and the films for which they won.

See also

 Bengal Film Journalists' Association Awards
 Cinema of India

External links
 Awards list 

Bengal Film Journalists' Association Awards